HLA-DR13(DR13) is a HLA-DR serotype that recognizes the DRB1*1301 to *13082, *1310 and some other *13 gene products. DR13 serotype is a split antigen of the older HLA-DR6 serotype group which also contains the similar HLA-DR14 antigens.

Alleles

Serotypes are unknown the following alleles: DRB1*1309, *1315 to *1379
DRB1*13 allele group
 81 Alleles: 74 proteins
 DR13 (weak or no DR6) Serotype: *1301, *1302, *1304, *1306, *1307, *1310, *1312 to *1314
 DR6 (weak DR13) Serotype: *1308
 DR13&Other serotypes: *1303, *1305, *1311,
 Serotype unknown: *1309, *1315 to *1374

Disease associations
DRB1*1302 is linked to early childhood myastenia gravis. Alleles of DR13 along with immunization for hepatitis B and C are most protective against the disease.

Extended linkage
DRB1*1302:DQA1*0102:DQB1*0604 Early childhood myastenia gravis

Genetic Linkage

HLA-DR13 is genetically linked to DR52 and HLA-DQ6 (HLA-DQ1) serotypes.

References

6